Lightbank is a financial organization founded by Brad Keywell and Eric Lefkofsky. The organization specializes in making venture capital investments in "disruptive" technology companies in the United States including seed investments, Series A round and late-stage investments..It combines investment with guidance and direct involvement with the companies it invests in. It is headquartered in Chicago and it has made investments in companies in Chicago, New York City, Omaha and the Bay Area.

Investments
Lightbank has invested in a number of companies, including the website Groupon. Lightbank's Eric Lefkofsky was an original co-founder, along with Andrew Mason of Groupon.

Other Lightbank investments include Sprout Social, Snapsheet, Belly, Boom Technology, Fiverr, Fooda, SpotHero, Tempus, Udemy, test preparation service BenchPrep, Qwiki, HighGround, and Hello Divorce.

Partners 
Lefkofsky was a co-founder of Lightbank, though he became 'Special Advisor' in 2014-2015 during his tenure as CEO of Groupon. He then returned to Lightbank as managing partner in November 2015 after stepping down as CEO of Groupon.

Other partners include Eric Ong, Matt Sacks, and Bill Pescatello.

See also
Venture builders

References

External links
 

Venture capital firms of the United States
Private equity firms of the United States
Companies based in Chicago
Financial services companies established in 2010
2010 establishments in Illinois